Chariesthes sesensis is a species of beetle in the family Cerambycidae. It was described by Hintz in 1912. It is known from Uganda.

References

Endemic fauna of Uganda
Chariesthes
Beetles described in 1912